Dedo Difie Agyarko-Kusi is a Ghanaian politician. She served as Ghana's Ambassador to South Korea. She is a member of the New Patriotic Party. She is the sister of the Emmanuel Kwabena Kyeremateng Agyarko and Boakye Agyarko. She once served as a translator of French and Spanish for UNESCO.

Early life and education 
Agyarko-Kusi attended Wesley Girls' Senior High School. She later went the University of Ghana where  she  acquired her Bachelor of Arts degree in French. Kusi also holds a masters of law from the University of Paris.

Politics 
Kusi has served as a member of the NPP national council and also parliamentary candidate for Lower Manya Krobo in the Eastern Region.

Career

Ambassador to South Korea 
In July 2017, President Nana Akuffo-Addo named Agyarko-Kusi as Ghana's High Commissioner to South Korea. She was among the Ghanaians who were named to head various diplomatic Ghanaian missions across the world. She was sworn in on 2 August 2017 by the Nana Akufo-Addo.

Personal life 
Kusi is the sister of Boakye Agyarko and Emmanuel Kwabena Kyeremateng Agyarko.

References 

Living people
Ambassadors of Ghana to South Korea
Ghanaian women ambassadors
New Patriotic Party politicians
Year of birth missing (living people)
People educated at Wesley Girls' Senior High School